Tatosoma transitaria is a species of moth in the family Geometridae first described by Francies Walker in 1862. It is endemic to New Zealand.

References

Trichopterygini
Moths described in 1862
Moths of New Zealand
Endemic fauna of New Zealand
Taxa named by Francis Walker (entomologist)
Endemic moths of New Zealand